Deonte DeAngelo Burton (born January 31, 1994) is an American professional basketball player for the Stockton Kings of the NBA G League. He played college basketball for the Marquette Golden Eagles and the Iowa State Cyclones.

Early life and high school career
Deonte was born in Milwaukee, Wisconsin to Charles Burton and the late Barbara Malone. He has five brothers, Demario Burton, Omar Burton, Charles Grafton, Prentiss Grafton and Keylow Rogers and one sister Nicole Grafton.

After his freshman year at Harold S. Vincent, and when Deonte's mother was diagnosed with cancer he transferred back to Vincent to be close to family. After being recruited by Memphis, Rutgers, and others, Burton ultimately accepted a scholarship from Marquette to again stay close to home.

College career

Freshman season
As a freshman Burton was a rotation player off the bench. He averaged 6.9 points per game while earning a spot on the Big East All-Rookie team. He scored a season high 23 points against Xavier and scored in double figures in 13 games during the season.

Sophomore season
Burton only played in eight games at Marquette before deciding to transfer. During that time, he averaged 6.4 points and 40% from beyond the three-point arc. He transferred to Iowa State mid-season.

Junior season
After transferring mid-season, Burton had to sit out the first half of the 2015–16 season becoming eligible on December 19. During his 26 games and seven starts, Burton had an up and down season. He averaged 9.7 points and 3.9 rebounds and was able to secure 24 steals and 16 blocks. He was also named the Big 12 Newcomer of the Year. At the conclusion of the season Burton entered the NBA Draft for evaluation but ultimately withdrew his name.

Senior season

Burton's breakout season was his senior season. He started all 35 games for the Cyclones en route to averaging 15.1 points and 6.2 rebounds. His 60 steals tie for 16th most by a Cyclone in a single season. He scored a career high 31 points against Oklahoma. Burton scored 29 and hit a career best 7–9 three-pointers in a win at Kansas. At the conclusion of the season He was named to the Second-team All-Big 12. After the season he participated in the NABC's Reese's College All-Star game and the Portsmouth Invitational.

Professional career

Wonju DB Promy (2017–2018)
Burton went undrafted in the 2017 NBA draft, but signed with the Minnesota Timberwolves for Summer League. He later signed with the Wonju DB Promy in South Korea's Korean Basketball League.
In Burton’s single season in Korea he averaged 23.8 Points, 3.8 Assists and 7 Rebounds, which earned him the K.B.L. Foreign MVP Award.

Oklahoma City Thunder (2018–2020)
Burton agreed to a two-way deal with the Oklahoma City Thunder on July 7, 2018.

On March 10, 2019, Burton was signed to a standard NBA contract.

Maine Celtics (2021–2022)
On December 21, 2021, Burton was acquired by the Maine Celtics of the NBA G League.

Sacramento / Stockton Kings (2022–present)
On November 3, 2022, Burton was named to the opening night roster for the Stockton Kings.

On January 30, 2023, Burton signed a 10-day contract with the Sacramento Kings. However, the Kings waived him on February 8, and he was re-acquired by Stockton.

Career statistics

NBA

Regular season

|-
| style="text-align:left;"|
| style="text-align:left;"|Oklahoma City
| 32 || 0 || 7.5 || .402 || .296 || .667 || .9 || .3 || .2 || .3 || 2.6
|-
| style="text-align:left;"|
| style="text-align:left;"|Oklahoma City
| 39 || 0 || 9.1 || .344 || .189 || .571 || 1.5 || .4 || .2 || .3 || 2.7
|-
| style="text-align:left;"|
| style="text-align:left;"|Sacramento
| 2 || 0 || 3.0 || .000 || .000 ||  || .0 || .0 || .0 || .0 || .0
|- class="sortbottom"
| style="text-align:center;" colspan="2"|Career
| 73 || 0 || 8.2 || .364 || .222 || .615 || 1.2 || .4 || .2 || .2 || 2.5

Playoffs

|-
| style="text-align:left;"|2019
| style="text-align:left;"|Oklahoma City
| 3 || 0 || 1.3 || .200 || .000 ||  || .7 || .0 || .0 || .0 || .7
|-
| style="text-align:left;"|2020
| style="text-align:left;"|Oklahoma City
| 1 || 0 || 2.0 ||  ||  ||  || .0 || .0 || .0 || .0 || .0
|- class="sortbottom"
| style="text-align:center;" colspan="2"|Career
| 4 || 0 || 1.5 || .200 || .000 ||  || .5 || .0 || .0 || .0 || .5

College statistics

|-
| style="text-align:left;"|2013–14
| style="text-align:left;"|Marquette
| 32 || 3 || 12.6 || .477 || .500 || .647 || 2.2 || 0.5 || 1.1 || 0.4 || 6.9
|-
| style="text-align:left;"|2014–15
| style="text-align:left;"|Marquette
| 8 || 8 || 16.1 || .500 || .400 || .765 || 1.4 || 0.3 || 1.3 || 0.4 || 6.4
|-
| style="text-align:left;"|2015–16
| style="text-align:left;"|Iowa State
| 26 || 7 || 18.8 || .533 || .474 || .635 || 3.9 || 1.0 || 0.9 || 0.6 || 9.7
|-
| style="text-align:left;"|2016–17
| style="text-align:left;"|Iowa State
| 35 || 35 || 29.5 || .456 || .375 || .675 || 6.2 || 1.8 || 1.7 || 1.4 || 15.1
|- class="sortbottom"
| style="text-align:center;" colspan="2"|Career
| 101 || 53 || 20.3 || .478 || .405 || .664 || 4.0 || 1.1 || 1.3 || 0.8 || 10.4

References

External links

 Iowa State Cyclones bio

1994 births
Living people
American expatriate basketball people in South Korea
American men's basketball players
Basketball players from Milwaukee
Iowa State Cyclones men's basketball players
Maine Celtics players
Marquette Golden Eagles men's basketball players
Oklahoma City Blue players
Oklahoma City Thunder players
Sacramento Kings players
Shooting guards
Small forwards
Undrafted National Basketball Association players
Wonju DB Promy players
United States men's national basketball team players